Kateřina Pauláthová (born 23 July 1993) is a retired alpine skier from the Czech Republic. She competed for Czech Republic at the 2014 Winter Olympics in the alpine skiing events.

References

External links
Official website 

1993 births
Living people
Alpine skiers at the 2014 Winter Olympics
Alpine skiers at the 2018 Winter Olympics
Czech female alpine skiers
Olympic alpine skiers of the Czech Republic
People from Havířov
Sportspeople from the Moravian-Silesian Region